The 1882 New Hampshire gubernatorial election was held on November 7, 1882. Republican nominee Samuel W. Hale defeated Democratic nominee Martin V. B. Edgerly with 50.36% of the vote.

General election

Candidates
Major party candidates
Samuel W. Hale, Republican
Martin V. B. Edgerly, Democratic

Other candidates
John Woodbury, Greenback
Josiah M. Fletcher, Prohibition

Results

References

1882
New Hampshire
Gubernatorial